Secondary spill containment  is the containment of hazardous liquids in order to prevent pollution of soil and water. Common techniques include the use of spill berms to contain oil-filled equipment, fuel tanks, truck washing decks, or any other places or items that may leak hazardous liquids.

Definition
Secondary spill containment involves the sequestration of hazardous waste to prevent the contamination of local soils and water.

In the electrical utility industry

United States Environmental Protection Agency (EPA) Spill Prevention, Control, and Countermeasure (SPCC) guidelines require that facilities that store large quantities of petroleum (products) must have a plan in place to contain a spill. The purpose of the SPCC rule is to establish requirements for facilities to prevent a discharge of oil into navigable waters or adjoining shorelines. Within the electric utility industry, oil-filled transformers are often in need of secondary containment. Outdated secondary containment techniques such as concrete catch-basins are quickly losing ground to solutions that offer more cost-effective cleanup in case of a spill or leak. One example of a more cost-effective method involves placing a geotextile boom filled with oil solidifying polymers around a transformer. These geotextile barriers allow for flow of water, but completely solidify oil in the event of a leak and effectively seal the spill. Many electrical utility companies are switching to this method because it saves them significant amounts of money when a spill occurs, because there is no need to employ vac-trucks afterwards to clean up a spill inside a catch-basin.

Portable spill containment

Portable containment berms are essentially a basin that can catch many different types of hazardous liquids and chemicals. They are a form of secondary spill containment useful for containing mobile equipment such as oil drums, trucks, tankers and trailers. Unlike geotextile berms, portable berms usually do not solidify oil.
Many companies involved in fracking use spill containment berms to capture contaminated water that is a by-product of the operation. Each well site has multiple trucks that transport water used in deep well drilling procedure.

See also
 Bunding

References

External links
 U.S. Environmental Protection Agency (US EPA)

External links

United States Environmental Protection Agency
Chemical safety
Environmental protection